Benjamin David Pearson (born 4 January 1995) is an English professional footballer who plays as a midfielder for EFL Championship club Stoke City on loan from Premier League club AFC Bournemouth. 

Born in Oldham, he joined Manchester United at the age of 9 in July 2004 and worked his way up through the academy. He joined Barnsley on a one-month loan in January 2015, which was extended to a season-long loan. He then rejoined Barnsley on a six-month loan in July 2015, before signing for Preston North End in January 2016.

He has also represented England at youth international level, playing for the under-16s, under-17s, under-18s, under-19s and under-20s.

Club career

Manchester United

Early career
Born in Oldham, Pearson began his football career with Manchester United, joining their academy as a nine-year-old in July 2004. He made his debut for the under-18s as a 14-year-old in a friendly against Maltese club Hibernians on 28 October 2009. After appearing as an unused substitute in a league match against Crewe Alexandra on 17 December 2010, he made his debut for the under-18s on 16 April 2011, coming on as a 63rd-minute substitute for the injured Charni Ekangamene in a 6–0 defeat away to Liverpool. In July 2011, Pearson was part of the Manchester United under-17 side that reached the final of the Milk Cup, where they lost 5–1 to the ASPIRE Academy from Qatar.

Two weeks later, Pearson was named as one of 16 first-year academy scholars for the 2011–12 season. He made six appearances (four from the bench) before going down with a bout of glandular fever in November 2011. He made his return four months later, starting in a 3–3 home draw with Sunderland on 10 March 2012; after United went 3–0 up, he conceded the penalty that led to Sunderland's opening goal. After playing 76 minutes of the first leg of the FA Youth Cup semi-final against Chelsea on 16 March, Pearson scored his first goal for the under-18s in a 2–1 home win over Newcastle on 31 March. By the end of the season, Pearson had become a regular fixture in the under-18s, finishing with 16 appearances.

Pearson started the 2012–13 season with a goal in each of the under-18s' first two matches, against Stoke City and Tottenham Hotspur. By the start of February 2013, Pearson had appeared in 13 of a possible 14 matches for the under-18s, leading to his debut for the under-21s on 6 February, coming on as a substitute for Charni Ekangamene in a 7–0 win over Oldham Athletic in the Manchester Senior Cup. Pearson was ever-present for the under-18s in the last 12 games of the season, and his performances earned him the Jimmy Murphy Young Player of the Year award for 2012–13. With the under-18s season over, he joined up with the under-21s again for their last four games of the season, first of which was another Manchester Senior Cup fixture against Oldham, in which he played 69 minutes as United won 3–1 before he was replaced by Andreas Pereira. Pearson's season culminated with an appearance in the Under-21 Premier League final against Tottenham at Old Trafford on 20 May, in which he was replaced by Tom Lawrence after 56 minutes.

The 2013–14 season started for Pearson with the final of the previous season's Lancashire Senior Cup on 6 August 2013, coming on for goalscorer Davide Petrucci in the 81st minute as United beat Manchester City 2–1. His next appearance came for the under-19s on 17 September, as they beat Bayer Leverkusen 4–3 at home in the opening match of the inaugural UEFA Youth League; Pearson marked the occasion by scoring United's second goal. In the third game of the competition on 23 October, he was sent off in the dying seconds as United lost 1–0 at home to Real Sociedad. Pearson was a regular in the under-21s for the rest of the season, making a total of 17 appearances in all competitions, plus 5 in the UEFA Youth League.

Barnsley (loan)
After 7 appearances out of a possible 10 for Manchester United under-21s to start the 2014–15 season, Pearson joined League One side Barnsley on a one-month loan on 8 January 2015. Two days later, he made his professional debut, playing the full 90 minutes of a 2–0 home win over Yeovil Town. He scored his first senior goal in Barnsley's game at home to Port Vale on 31 January, scoring their second just after half-time in a 2–1 win. His loan spell was extended by one month in February 2015 and on 9 March 2015 it was confirmed that he would remain at Barnsley until the end of the 2014–15 season. Pearson rejoined Barnsley on a six-month loan deal on 18 July 2015.

Preston North End
On 11 January 2016, he signed for Championship side Preston North End for an undisclosed fee. He scored his first goal for the club on 1 October 2016, opening the scoring in a 2–0 victory over Aston Villa.

In July 2019 Pearson spoke about his on-field disciplinary problems, including 14 booking and 3 sendings off in the 2018–19 season, which has seen his mother stop watching him play.

AFC Bournemouth
On 29 January 2021, Pearson joined AFC Bournemouth for an undisclosed fee, signing a three-and-a-half year contract.

Stoke City (loan)
On 31 January 2023, Pearson joined Stoke City on loan for the remainder of the 2022–23 season.

International career

Pearson made his international debut for the England Under-16s in a 2–1 win at home to Scotland on 30 March 2011. He made three more appearances for the Under-16s, against Uruguay, the United Arab Emirates and Guinea. Before the end of the year, he made four appearances for the Under-17s, including wins over Italy and the Netherlands.

Pearson's form for Manchester United in 2012–13 led to a call-up to the England Under-18s in March 2013, and despite not captaining his club side, he was asked to lead the national team for their 1–0 defeat away to Belgium on 30 March. He only made the one appearance for the Under-18s before making the step up to Under-19 level in May 2013, making his debut against Georgia on 24 May. He played in all three of England's qualifying round matches ahead of the 2014 UEFA European Under-19 Championship, scoring twice in a 7–0 win over Andorra as England finished top of their group ahead of Switzerland and Slovenia.

He made one appearance for the England Under-20s in October 2014, a 3–2 win over the Netherlands, in which he was substituted by Harrison Reed in the first minute of injury time.

Career statistics

Honours
AFC Bournemouth
Championship runner-up: 2021–22

Individual
Jimmy Murphy Young Player of the Year: 2012–13

References

External links

Profile at ManUtd.com
Profile at RedStat.co.uk
Profile at TheFA.com

1995 births
Living people
Footballers from Oldham
English footballers
Association football midfielders
Manchester United F.C. players
Barnsley F.C. players
Preston North End F.C. players
AFC Bournemouth players
Stoke City F.C. players
English Football League players
Premier League players
England youth international footballers